Set It Off is an American rock band formed in 2008 in Tampa, Florida. 

The band initially gained a large following through singer Cody Carson's YouTube channel. Their following calls themselves "Freaks”. Set It Off was signed by Equal Vision Records after releasing a string of successful extended-play albums. In 2018, they signed with Fearless Records, which in February 2019 released Midnight, their fourth studio album.

History

Formation (2008)  
Cody Carson and Dan Clermont, who met in their high school marching band, formed a band, which brushed against another band created by Austin M. Kerr and Zach DeWall while playing local shows. After high school, Carson left for Ohio to attend the Oberlin Conservatory of Music as a classical clarinet student. In his first year, after exchanging a series of YouTube videos with All Time Low frontman Alex Gaskarth, Carson asked to sing "Coffee Shop Soundtrack" at the group's upcoming concert at the Cleveland House of Blues via a YouTube video. The performance led Carson to drop out of college and use his school money to start up the band.

DeWall and Kerr were among the first to join; Dan Clermont followed as the band's lead guitar player. James Arran was Set It Off's first drummer, but financial struggles made gas purchases difficult for him, and he resigned August on 24, 2008. He was succeeded by Blake Howell, who soon left the band due to family difficulties. Howell was replaced by Benjamin Panico (a.k.a. Benji Panic) on October 30, 2009; he left to pursue his GED and, later, start his own photography studio. Howell introduced the band to their current drummer, Maxx Danziger.

Early releases (2008–2010)
 Released their first EP: Baby, You Don't Tripajaharda, on October 31, 2008.
 Self-released their EP: Calm Before the Storm on May 16, 2009.
 Self-released the single "Hush Hush" on September 6, 2010. A music video was made to accompany the song on October 4, 2010.
 Released the single "Together Forever" on November 16, 2010.
 Released the single "@Reply" on December 25, 2010. A music video was later made to accompany the song.
 Self-released their EP: Horrible Kids, which included "@Reply".

Horrible Kids (2011–2012)
On July 19, 2011, the band announced its signing to Equal Vision Records and that the label would issue a remastered version of its self-released EP Horrible Kids, along with the single "Chase It!" on August 30, 2011.

Carson said, "Our main inspiration in writing this album was derived from personal experiences growing up. I loved being able to turn to songs that I could personally relate to. I want to provide that same kind of coping source for people. I want people to be able to turn on Horrible Kids and pick a song that pinpoints exactly what they're going through and allows them to vent through it."

The album debuted in the top 100 Alternative Albums on iTunes. Horrible Kids was recorded at Red Sparrow Studios in Wilson, North Carolina. It was produced, engineered, and mixed by Brandon Ham and John Harrell.

Cinematics (2013–2014)

In July 2012, Set It Off announced the upcoming release of its debut full-length album Cinematics. A deluxe version was released on September 18, 2012.

Through the VH1 Save the Music Foundation, the band donated $1 for every album sold before September 23 to support music programs in schools. The band also donated their bonus, generating a total donation of $5,000. Equal Vision Records agreed to match the band's donation if the band reached No. 1 on the Billboard Heatseekers Chart.

Cody Carson said, "We're honored to be working with VH1 Save The Music. If it wasn't for the music education program in my high school, Set It Off would not exist. I would not have met our guitarist, Dan Clermont, I wouldn't have been directed toward Oberlin Music Conservatory, and I wouldn't end up with even half of the musical knowledge I possess now. More people need to be able to experience the unity, leadership skills, and work ethic taught by being involved in music education programs in schools. Set It Off strongly endorses this organization for these, among many other, reasons. We're so excited to raise money for them and help spread the word about the importance of music education."

The album, which was produced, mixed, and recorded by Zack Odom and Kenneth Mount at ZK Productions, debuted at No. 174 on the Billboard 200, No. 4 on the Top Heatseekers, and No. 38 on the Independent Albums chart.

On June 25, 2013, the band released an expanded edition of the album with a new cover. In October 2013, Fearless Records released the album Punk Goes Christmas, which featured an original Set It Off song, "This Christmas (I'll Burn It to the Ground)."

On October 29, 2022, the song "Partners in Crime" ft. Ash Costello reached 100,000,000 streams on Spotify.

Duality (2014–2016)
On January 2, 2014, Equal Vision Records announced via YouTube that Set It Off would record an album with John Feldmann, which would be released October 14, 2014. The band recorded the album in Los Angeles with several producers, including Brandon Paddock, Tommy English, and Matt Appleton. A music video for "Why Worry" was filmed at St. Mark's Church in-the-Bowery in Manhattan on August 21, 2014, using fans as extras. That August, it was announced that the band would be supporting Black Veil Brides on their headline Black Mass Tour through October and November, joining Falling in Reverse and Drama Club. The first single off the album was released on September 9, 2014. The album was included at number 5 on Rock Sounds "Top 50 Albums of the Year" list.

2014 also saw Set It Off featured on Fearless Records' Punk Goes Pop 6, on which the band covered Ariana Grande's "Problem".

On February 25, 2015, the band announced they would be playing at the Vans Warped Tour '15 on the Journeys shoe stage.

On March 2, 2015, a music video for "Ancient History" was released, featuring actress Chelsea Mee.

May 20, 2015, Set It Off announced that Austin Kerr would no longer be a part of the band, Kerr subsequently went on to pursue a solo hip hop career.

On July 4, 2015, a music video for "Forever Stuck in Our Youth" was released.

In November 2015, Fearless Records released the album Punk Goes Christmas: Deluxe Edition, still featuring Set It Off's original song "This Christmas (I'll Burn It to the Ground)".

On January 13, 2016, a music video for the album's title track, "Duality," was uploaded to YouTube.

On March 22, 2016, the band announced it would be playing at the Vans Warped Tour for the second year in a row, this time on the main stage.

Upside Down (2016)

The band released its album Upside Down on October 7, 2016. It doubled Dualitys first-week sales.

Additionally, the band released both music and lyric videos for their song “Life Afraid.”

Signing to Fearless Records, Midnight and Elsewhere (2018-current)
In 2018, Set It Off announced that they would be leaving Equal Vision and signing to Fearless Records.

At the beginning of the year, Set It Off did a livestream video on YouTube in order to write a song with its audience. Over 1,000 people came into the stream and submitted their lyric ideas. The band members took their favorite lyrics from those suggested and added guitar parts and melodies to create their single "Hourglass Love", released on YouTube soon after, on January 4.

On July 24, Set It Off released its single "Killer in the Mirror" with a music video.

On November 19, they announced on Twitter that their fourth studio album "Midnight", would be released on February 1, 2019. Also, on that same day, they released their single “Lonely Dance” including a music video.

On December 14, they released two singles, "For You Forever" and "Dancing with the Devil", from "Midnight".

On January 1, 2019, they released "Midnight Thoughts" exactly at midnight to celebrate the new year.

On May 4, 2019, allegations of sexual assault against Dan Clermont were released on an anonymous Twitter account. The band announced on May 6, 2019, that Dan would be taking a hiatus from the band to be with his family while this matter is addressed.

On June 12, 2019, vocalist Cody Carson announced that he had a vocal haemorrhage, just after the final date of Part 2 of the Midnight World Tour. He continued with Part 3 of the tour despite this.

On June 28, 2019, an acoustic version of "Wolf in Sheep's Clothing" from Duality was featured on Punk Goes Acoustic Vol. 3.

On September 11, 2019, after Part 3 of the Midnight World Tour, vocalist Cody Carson announced that due to his vocal cord injury he had to have surgery. As a result, Part 4 of the tour has been delayed to March 2020.

On September 30, 2019, the band announced the departure of Dan Clermont in a Tweet. The Tweet mentions he left “in order to focus on other areas of his life”. Subsequently, according to the same Tweet, the band announced they have decided to continue on as a three-piece group.

On February 14, 2020, they released their fourth EP titled "After Midnight".

On October 29, 2021, the band released a single titled "Skeleton" and on January 21, 2022, they released a song titled "Projector." On February 18, 2022, they released "Who's In Control."

The band commenced their "Welcome to Elsewhere Tour" on January 14, 2022, and with no delays the tour will last until February 12.

On March 11, 2022, the band released their fifth album titled "Elsewhere".

Music videos, lyric videos
Set It Off has music videos released for the songs "Pages & Paragraphs", "@Reply", "Horrible Kids", "Breathe In, Breathe Out", "Swan Song", "Why Worry", "Ancient History", "Wild Wild World", "Partners in Crime" (feat. Ash Costello), "Forever Stuck in Our Youth", "Duality", "Uncontainable", "Something New", "Life Afraid", "Hypnotized", and "Killer in the Mirror", "Lonely Dance”, “Dancing With the Devil”, "Hourglass", "Skeleton", "Projector", "Why Do I" and "Dangerous". Additionally, there is a music video for Set It Off's Punk Goes Christmas song, "This Christmas (I'll Burn It to the Ground)". Official lyric videos have also been released for "I'll Sleep When I'm Dead", "Swan Song", "Kill the Lights", "Bleak December", "Life Afraid", "Skeleton", "Projector" and "Why Do I."

Touring

Set It Off has currently played in over 22 tours. Set It Off was also accompanied on tour by merchandise manager, Marshall Travers, and tour manager, Andrew Cramb. Cramb attended private school with several members of the band and had been on tour with the band since 2009. However, Cramb backed down from this position after graduating college. In 2013, Set It Off toured Europe with Yellowcard. In that same year, Set It Off supported Tonight Alive on its UK tour in October, along with Decade. The band played Warped Tour 2013 on dates 6/15-7/3 and 7/6-8/4 and played with Candy Hearts, State Champs, William Beckett, and We Are The in Crowd during WATIC's Reunion Tour in spring of 2014. The band also co-headlined the Come Alive Tour with Our Last Night, featuring Stages & Stereos and Heartist; supported Black Veil Brides and Falling in Reverse on the Black Mass Tour; and, beginning in February 2015, the group began its first USA headliner, The Glamour Kills Spring Break Tour, with support from Against The Current, As It Is, and Roam. The band played the entirety of the 2015 Vans Warped Tour. The band also played on the Rise of the Runaways Tour (January and February 2015), through various continents, with Crown the Empire and Alive Like Me.

Set It Off began a UK/Europe tour in May 2015, with stops in Belgium, France, Germany, the Netherlands and the United Kingdom. From March 1 to March 28, 2016, Set It Off went on 'The Fight For Something Tour' with fellow band Tonight Alive and played the entirety of the 2016 Vans Warped Tour, except for the first show in Anchorage, Alaska. The band had since toured supporting Simple Plan and Sleeping With Sirens for some time after. This year, Set It Off went on their first headline tour from January 16 to February 16. Later, the band played at Vans Warped Tour, the last one ever, on July 27 in Mansfield, MA; July 28 in Wantagh, NY; and August 3 in Orlando, FL. As of January 2020, the band is headline-touring in the United States and Canada. In March 2020 they supported Japanese rock band ONE OK ROCK along with Brisbane-based band Stateside on the Australian leg of their Eye of the Storm world tour.

Their 2019 European tour (Midnight World Tour Part 4: UK/Europe) was postponed in September 2019 with rescheduled dates for March/April 2020 due to Cody Carson's vocal injury/vocal surgery. Broadside (band) was to open for them at the rescheduled dates. However, these dates had to be postponed a second time due to the COVID-19 pandemic. The dates were moved to August/September 2020 with openers Broadside, Cemetery Sun, and Lizzy Farrall. They were then postponed again due to COVID, the tour was then renamed "Midnight Tour Part Four The Love Of God Don’t Make Us Reschedule Again", it was then rescheduled two more times and renamed as the following "Midnight Tour Part Four The Love Of God Don’t Make Us Reschedule Again, Again..." then ""Welcome to Elsewhere Tour, formally The Midnight World Tour Part Four The Love of God (Again) Please Don't Make Us Reschedule Again, Again", New dates for their EU/UK Tour were announced on 3/25/2022.

In January 2023, Set It Off announced a United States tour (The Dopamine Tour), with Scene Queen, In Her Own Words, and RIVALS as special guests.

Musical style
During Set It Off's early years the band fit into the pop punk genre exclusively, but they added R&B elements with Duality in 2014, and then they transitioned to pop rock. In 2015, Kerrang! magazine summarized the band's genre as pop rock. The band introduced more influences such as emo and hip hop beginning with 2019's Midnight.

MembersCurrent Cody Carson – lead vocals, keyboards, piano, guitar, clarinet, alto saxophone (2008–present)
 Zach DeWall – guitar (2008–present), bass, backing vocals (2015–present)
 Maxx Danziger – drums (2010–present)Former James Arran – drums (2008)
 Blake Howell – drums (2008)
 Benji Panico – drums (2008–2010)
 Austin Kerr – bass (2008–2015)
 Dan Clermont – guitar, keyboards, piano, trumpet, backing vocals (2008–2019)Timeline'''

Discography

Studio albums
 Cinematics (2012)
 Duality (2014)
 Upside Down (2016)
 Midnight (2019)
 Elsewhere (2022)

Extended plays
 Baby, You Don't Tripajaharda (2008)
 Calm Before the Storm (2009)
 Horrible Kids (2011)
 Duality: Stories Unplugged (2015)
 After Midnight (2020)

Singles

Music videos

Other appearances
 Punk Goes Christmas (2013) – "This Christmas (I'll Burn It to the Ground)"
 Punk Goes Pop Vol. 6 (2014) – "Problem" (originally performed by Ariana Grande, featuring Iggy Azalea)
 Punk Goes Acoustic Vol. 3 (2019) - "Wolf in Sheep's Clothing"
 IN THREES (Single) (2021) - "IN THREES" by As It Is (band) , Featuring Set It Off and JordyPurp
 Older (Single) (2022) - "Older" by No Love For The Middle Child , Featuring Set It Off
 I WENT TO HELL AND BACK (2022) - "IN THREES" by As It Is (band) , Featuring Set It Off and JordyPurp
 Barbie & Ken (Single) (2022) - "Barbie & Ken" by Scene Queen'', Featuring Set It Off

References
 Citations

Sources

External links

 In the Studio Set It Off
 Set It Off is looking to set off the music industry

Alternative rock groups from Florida
Musical groups from Tampa, Florida
Fearless Records artists
Equal Vision Records artists